Trachelium caeruleum, common name blue throatwort, is a species of flowering plant in the family Campanulaceae native to the Mediterranean, where its native range includes Algeria, Morocco, Portugal, Spain, and Sicily. It has also become naturalized in a few areas, including New Zealand, the Azores, and parts of mainland Europe.
 
The specific epithet caeruleum means "dark blue".

In temperate climates this plant is usually grown as a half-hardy annual for summer bedding schemes or planters. It has gained the Royal Horticultural Society's Award of Garden Merit.  There are many cultivars with a variety of flower colors, including white, red, pink, and dark purple.

References

Campanuloideae
Plants described in 1753
Taxa named by Carl Linnaeus
Flora of Malta